Chad Vandegriffe (born November 24, 1989) is an American soccer and indoor soccer player who currently plays for Florida Tropics SC in the Major Arena Soccer League.

Youth
Prior to turning pro, Vandegriffe was a standout at Chaminade College Preparatory School (Missouri), where he was a four-year letter winner, team captain and Defensive Player of the Year.  He helped lead the school to the Missouri Class 3 state championship in 2006.  Other accolades include first-team all-Midwest, first-team all-state, first-team All-Metro Catholic Conference, and he was named to Great Midwest Classic All-Tournament Team.  He also lettered in baseball and basketball.

Vandegriffe played club soccer with  St. Louis Scott Gallagher Soccer Club, where he helped lead his team to Missouri state championships in 2005, 2006 and 2007 prior to playing in the U.S. Soccer Development Academy. He was a U-23 regional champion and national runner-up in 2011.

College
Vandegriffe played two years of college soccer at Southern Methodist University in 2008 and 2009, before transferring to Saint Louis University in 2010.

Vandegriffe made the Atlantic 10 Conference all-tournament team in 2010 and earned honorable mention, Atlantic 10 Conference, in 2011.

Professional

After playing with the St. Louis Ambush in the Major Indoor Soccer League, then in the Major Arena Soccer League in 2014–15, Vandegriffe signed with United Soccer League expansion club Saint Louis FC on March 13, 2015. After the USL season concluded, the Ambush announced that Vandegriffe would be returning to the team for the 2015–16 season.

On December 23, 2015, Saint Louis FC announced a number of players would be returning for the 2016 season, including Vandegriffe.

On October 3, 2016, the Milwaukee Wave announced the signing of Vandegriffe for the 2016–17 Major Arena Soccer League season.

On June 30, 2017, the Wave announced that Vandegriffe had re-signed for three seasons.

Vandegriffe signed a two-year contract with Florida Tropics SC on July 23, 2020.

Vandegriffe, the 2021-22 Major Arena Soccer League Defender of the Year re-signed with the Florida Tropics on June 29, 2022. Vandegriffe, who led the MASL in blocks last season with 54, inked a new three-year contract with the club.

Honors
St. Louis Ambush
Major Indoor Soccer League – All-Rookie Team: 2013–14

Milwaukee Wave
Major Arena Soccer League – Champions: 2018–19

Florida Tropics
Major Arena Soccer League – Regular Season Champions: 2021
Major Arena Soccer League – All-Third Team: 2021
Major Arena Soccer League – “Elite Six” All-First Team: 2021-22
Major Arena Soccer League  - Defender of the Year: 2021-22
Major Arena Soccer League  - Finalists: 2021-22

References

External links
 Saint Louis FC bio
 St. Louis Ambush bio

1989 births
Living people
American soccer players
SMU Mustangs men's soccer players
Saint Louis Billikens men's soccer players
St. Louis Ambush (1992–2000) players
Saint Louis FC players
Milwaukee Wave players
Florida Tropics SC players
Association football defenders
Soccer players from St. Louis
Major Indoor Soccer League (2008–2014) players
Major Arena Soccer League players
USL Championship players
Chaminade College Preparatory School (Missouri) alumni